The Tyabji family, also known as Tyabji-Hydari, Tyabji-Fyzee, and Tyabji-Futehally family, consists of Mullah Tyab Ali and his descendants. The Tyabji family has gained fame for its exhaustive involvement in India's independence movement with individuals being prominent politicians, diplomats, academics, scientists, activists, and athletes. Other members gained prominence for their roles in India's Navy and Air Force and contribution to Indian film and fine art. Individuals within the Tyabji family belong to the Indian royal families of the Nizam of Hyderabad, the Nawab of Bengal, Raja of Wanaparthy, and the Nawab of Janjira. "The Tagores and the Tyabjis are the rarities for India and they are her friends" - Mahatma Gandhi.

Origin 
The family is descended from Mullah Tyab Ali Bhai Mian, a member of the Sulaimani Bohra community, and a scion of an old Cambay emigrant Arab family. The Tyabjis adopted the -ji suffix as a result of their high social status in Gujarat and Mumbai. Currently, the lingua franca of the Tyabjis is English.

The Tyabjis were primarily educated at the University of Oxford, the University of Cambridge, and St. Xavier’s College, Mumbai. With a minority having read at Aligarh Muslim University. Children were often sent to boarding schools in India such as Woodstock School, Mayo College, and Welham Girl’s school in Dehradun. The emergence of the family can largely be attributed to Badruddin Tyabji who held great influence with the Muslim community in Mumbai.

Governance and diplomacy 

Major-General Sahibzada Iskander Ali Mirza, Order of Pahlavi, India General Service Medal (1909) was the first President of Pakistan. He was educated at the University of Bombay and was the first Indian to attend the Royal Military College in Sandhurst. Mirza was appointed as the first Defence Secretary and later as Governor of East Bengal.

 Muhammad Akbar Nazar Ali Hydari, was the Prime Minister of Hyderabad State. He represented Hyderabad at the First Round Table Conference. He was later appointed as a member of the Privy Council of the United Kingdom. Hydari was the first Muslim to pass the examination of the Gazetted Officer for the Finance Department.

Badruddin Faiz Tyabji, served as the Indian ambassador to Indonesia, Iran, Germany, and Japan. In 1948, he was charged with starting the Embassy of India in Brussels, Belgium. He served as the Deputy Secretariat of the Constituent Assembly of India and as Vice-Chancellor of the Aligarh Muslim University.

Asaf Ali Asghar Fyzee, Padma Bhushan, served as India’s second ambassador to Egypt and Vice-Chancellor of the University of Jammu and Kashmir. Fyzee was a barrister-at-law and an advocate in the Bombay High Court. Fyzee was appointed as a member of the Union Public Service Commission, New Delhi. Fyzee was a member of the Indian delegation to the Third General Conference of UNESCO, held in Beirut in November 1948.

Agha Hilaly, ICS, Hilal-i-Quiad-I-Azam, Grand Cross of Order of Northern Star, Grand Cross of Order of Gurkha, was one of the first members to join the Civil Service of Pakistan and played a vital role in Pakistan’s foreign policy in the years following Partition. Hilaly graduated from the University of Cambridge. Hilaly served as the Pakistani ambassador to the United States of America, Sweden, Russia, the Czech Republic, and India. Hilaly represented Pakistan in the United Nations and facilitated the secret visit of US Secretary of State Henry Kissinger to China.

Shareefa Hamid Ali was the President of All India Women's Conference and a founding member of the United Nations Commission on the Status of Women in 1947. Ali could speak Urdu, Gujarati, Persian, Marathi, English and French. She represented India at the Istanbul Congress of the International Alliance of Women and partook in the Congress of the Women's International League for Peace and Freedom in Czechoslovakia. Ali was also a member of the National Planning Commission of the Indian National Congress and the Hindustan Textbook Committee. Ali's work at the United Nations influenced the United Nations Universal Declaration of Human Rights, the Convention on Consent to Marriage, the Minimum Age for Marriage, and the Registration of Marriages.

Sir Alma Camruddin Latifi, CIE, OBE, Kaisar-i-Hind Medal (1937), was a member of Punjab’s Legislative Council and Secretary of the Consulting Committee at the Third Round Table Conference in London in 1932. Latifi was of Gray’s Inn, Barrister-at-Law and Senior Whewell Professor of International Law, Cambridge, 1902. Latifi graduated with a degree from St. John’s College, Cambridge, a donation of a Bodhisattva head belonging to Latifi can be found in the British Museum in London. Latifi published several papers that can be found in the American Political Science Review and the Political Science Quarterly. Latifi was also a member of the exclusive Athenæum Club in London, a club that boasts 51 Nobel Laureates as members.

Saif Faiz Badruddin Tyabji was a Congress Member of Parliament in 1957 from Jalna Lok Sabha Constituency in Maharashtra. Tyabji received his degrees from the University of Bombay and the University of Cambridge. Tyabji opposed the purdah system and urged educated Muslims to take part in Indian politics and policymaking.

Danial Alma Latifi was the first Indian to practice as barrister in the Bombay High Court and the first Muslim to rise to position of Senior Advocate in the Indian Supreme Court. Latifi attended Government College Lahore and Rugby School and graduated with a BA and MA from St John’s College, Oxford. Latifi was called to the Bar at Gray’s Inn in 1939. Among Latifi’s well-known cases was the Shah Bano Case, Mohd. Ahmad Khan v. Shah Bano Begum which became household knowledge in India. Latifi presented St John’s College with a set of silver pattens in 1958, which remain in the College’s silver store.

Nawab Ali Yavar Jung Bahadur, IFS, Padma Vibhushan, Padma Bhushan, was an Indian diplomat and politician who served as the governor of Maharashtra. Bahadur studied at Queen's College, Oxford where he received a degree in History. Bahadur served as the Indian ambassador to Argentina, Egypt, Yugoslavia, Greece, and the United States of America. His close relationships with Juan Perón, Gamal Abdel Nasser, Josip Broz Tito, Charles de Gaulle, and Lyndon B. Johnson have been noted to have substantially contributed to foreign understanding of independent India’s foreign policy. The Western Express Highway in Mumbai and The National Institute for the Hearing Handicapped located there are named after him.

Mohammad Habib was an eminent Indian historian and politician, playing a role in the Indian independence movement. Habib was also a close associate of Mahatma Gandhi and Jawaharlal Nehru. Habib received his degrees from Aligarh Muslim University and New College, Oxford. In 1926 Habib won the Uttar Pradesh Legislative Council election representing the Swaraj Party. He unsuccessfully contested the position of Vice-President of India in 1967, losing to Varahagiri Venkata Giri.

Sir Muhammad Saleh Akbar Hydari, KCIE, CSI, ICS was the last Governor of Assam appointed by King George VI. Hydari graduated from the University of Oxford and served as the undersecretary in the Department of Education, Health and Lands of the imperial government of India. Hydari served as the secretary to the Imperial Council of Agricultural Research. Hydari represented Hyderabad State at the Round Table Conferences in London.

Mohsin Badruddin Tyabji, ICS, completed his degrees from St. Xavier’s College and Balliol College, University of Oxford. Tyabji was later Chief Justice of the Baroda High Court. Tyabji was the first Muslim to join the Indian Civil Service in 1885.

Salima Faiz Tyabji was a member of the Bombay Legislative Assembly in 1937. Tyabji completed her degrees from the University of Bombay and the University of Oxford. Tyabji worked with the Oxford University Press in Delhi, specialising in history.

Zafar Hilaly served as the Pakistani ambassador to Yemen, Nigeria, and Italy. Hilaly was educated at Highgate school and later joined the Pakistan Foreign Service.

Indian independence movement 

Badruddin Tyabji was a founding member and the first Muslim President of the Indian National Congress. Tyabji graduated from the University of London Middle Temple. Tyabji was the first Indian to hold the post of Chief Justice of the Bombay High Court. Tyabji was nominated to the Bombay Municipal Corporation, he was a member of the University of Bombay and appointed to the Bombay Legislative Council. Tyabji founded Anjuman-i-Islam College in Bombay.

“Be moderate in your demands, be just in your criticism, be accurate in your facts, be logical in your conclusions, and you may rest assured that any propositions you may make to our rulers will be received with that benign consideration which is the characteristic of a strong and enlightened Government.” From the Presidential Address - Badruddin Tyabji Indian National Congress Session, 1887, Madras.

Surayya Tyabji is recognised to have assisted in designing the flag of India. In the weeks leading up to Indian independence Jawaharlal Nehru instructed Tyabji’s husband Badruddin Tyabji to present a final design. This involved forming a committee with Dr Rajendra Prasad and contacting several of India’s top art schools. English historian Trevor Royle stated in The Last Days of The Raj: “Originally the tricolour was to have contained the spinning wheel symbol (charkha) used by Gandhi but this was a party symbol, which Tyabji thought might strike the wrong note. After much persuasion Gandhi agreed to the wheel because the Emperor Ashoka was venerated by Hindu and Muslim alike. The flag which flew on Nehru’s car that night had been specifically made by Tyabji’s wife”.

Abbas Tyabji the Grand Old Man of Gujarat was a freedom fighter and close associate of Mahatma Gandhi, Tyabji was a prominent figure in the Indian independence movement. Tyabji served as the Chief Justice of Baroda State. In 1919, Tyabji was appointed chairman of the independent fact-finding committee by the Indian National Congress for the Jallianwala Bagh massacre. This led to him becoming a loyal supporter of Gandhi and the independence movement. In 1930, the Indian National Congress declared Purna Swaraj, following Gandhi’s arrest Tyabji launched the Dharasana Satyagraha marching alongside Kasturba Gandhi. Tyabji was later appointed by Gandhi to become the leader of the Salt Satyagraha for which he was later arrested by the British Indian Government.

Raihana Tyabji was a staunch follower of Mahatma Gandhi and renounced her familial inheritance to devote her life to his cause. Tyabji played a major role in the Non-cooperation movement, urging the masses to adopt ‘swadeshi’ as the principle of their lives. Tyabji was the president of the Youth League Congress and was arrested for participating in the Indian independence movement. Even though Tyabji was a Muslim she regularly sang Hindu devotional songs and was the first Muslim to sing Vande Mataram at an Indian National Congress session. Tyabji worked with Gandhi to eradicate untouchability and legalise the prohibition of child marriage.

Royalty 

Nawab Sidi Sir Ahmad Khan Sidi Ibrahim Khan III, GCIE, was the king of the princely state of Janjira. Khan was a descendent of a North African seafaring Islamic tribe known as the Siddis. They were referred to as the best sea fighters in the Muslim world.

Princess Nazli Rafiya Begum of Janjira was married to Nawab Sidi Sir Ahmad Khan Sidi Ibrahim Khan III, GCIE. In 1908, she undertook a formal tour of Britain, Europe, and the Ottoman Empire in accompaniment of her princely husband. Alongside the Maharaja of Cooch Behar and Maharaja of Nepal, Begum and her husband were received by King Edward VII and Queen Alexandra in London.

Nawab Sayyid Mansur Ali Khan was the Nawab of Bengal. Khan succeeded his father at the age of eight years to become the Nawab of Bengal with Kishvar Khan as his Wazir and Khwaja Fazal Mohammed as the chief Qazi. Khan founded the Nizamat School and College and rebuilt the present building of Nizamat Imambara. Khan is the great grandfather of Major-General Sahibzada Iskander Ali Mirza , Order of Pahlavi, India General Service Medal (1909).

 Muhammad Akbar Nazar Ali Hydari  was the Prime Minister of Hyderabad State and a member of the Royal family of the Nizam of Hyderabad.

Academia 

Sálim Moizuddin Abdul Ali, Padma Vibhushan, Padma Bhushan, Order of the Golden Ark, the Birdman of India was an Indian ornithologist and naturalist. Ali played a major role in establishing the Bharatpur bird sanctuary, a UNESCO World Heritage Site, and preventing the destruction of Silent Valley National Park. Ali along with Sidney Dillon Ripley wrote the 10 volume Handbook of the Birds of India and Pakistan. Several species of birds as well as sanctuaries and institutions have been named after Ali, including the Salim Ali's fruit bat. Ali received his degree from St. Xavier's College, Mumbai and was a prominent contributor to the Bombay Natural History Society. Ali became the first non-British citizen to receive the Gold Medal of the British Ornithologists' Union.

Asaf Ali Asghar Fyzee, Padma Bhushan, was also an academic who is considered to be the father of modern Ismaili studies. Fyzee completed his LL. B at Government Law College, Mumbai and went on to study Arabic and Persian at St John's College, Cambridge under eminent orientalist Reynold A. Nicholson. Fyzee is best known for his work Outlines of Muhammadan law and was Principal and Perry Professor of Jurisprudence in Government Law College, Mumbai. Fyzee taught Islamic law at McGill University, University of Cambridge, and University of California, Los Angeles. Fyzee is listed as a notable alumni of St John's College, Cambridge.

Irfan Habib, Padma Bhushan, Yash Bharati, is an Indian historian of ancient and medieval India. Habib has authored several books including the Agrarian System of Mughal India, 1556-1707, an Atlas of the Mughal Empire: Political and Economic Maps with Detailed Notes, and an Atlas of Ancient Indian History. Habib graduated from Aligarh Muslim University and New College, Oxford. Habib is a Professor Emeritus at Aligarh Muslim University and delivered the Radhakrishnan Lecture at the University of Oxford in 1991. Habib is an Elected Corresponding Fellow of the British Royal Historical Society. Habib is an Honorary Fellow, New College, Oxford.

Humayun Abdulali was an Indian ornithologist and biologist who contributed greatly to bird collections at the Bombay Natural History Society. Abdulali graduated from St. Xavier's College, Mumbai with a Bachelor of Arts degree. Abdulali published 356 notes in his lifetime and covering birds, snakes, frogs, and other fauna. Abdulali authored 270 scientific papers and wrote 50 book reviews. Abdulali was elected to the Executive Committee of the BNHS in 1942 and served as Joint Secretary of the BNHS. Abdulali played a major role in drafting the Bombay Wild Animals and Wild Birds Protection Act of 1951. Abdulali obtained permission from the Prince of Wales Museum to house the BNHS in its premises. Several Taxa have been named in his honour including Nyctibatrachus humayuni.

Romulus Earl Whitaker, Padma Shri, an American Indian herpetologist and wildlife conservationist, is the founder of the Madras Snake Park, the Andaman and Nicobar Environment Trust, and the Madras Crocodile Bank Trust. Whitaker is a winner of a Whitley Award for outstanding leadership in nature conservation. Whitaker is a member of the advisory committee and the editorial board of the Bombay Natural History Society. Whitaker’s 1996 wildlife documentary, The King and I, received an Emmy Award for Outstanding News and Documentary Program Achievement.

Atiya Begum Fyzee was an author and the first woman from South Asia to attend the University of Cambridge. Fyzee was a close associate of Muhammad Ali Jinnah who allotted a palatial residence to her in Pakistan after the Partition. Fyzee published numerous works including a collection of anecdotes from her diary, Atiya's Journeys: A Muslim Woman from Colonial Bombay to Edwardian Britain.

Zafar Rashid Futehally, Padma Shri, Order of the Golden Ark, was an Indian naturalist and conservationist best known for his work as the secretary of the Bombay Natural History Society and for the Newsletter for Birdwatchers. Futehally studied economics at St. Xavier's College, Bombay. Futehally’s letters to Prime Minister Indira Gandhi led to the establishment of Karnala Bird Sanctuary in Raigad in the 1960s. Futehally published various works in the media and in scientific journals.

Social work 
Sumaira Abdulali is the founder of the NGO Awaaz Foundation and convenor of the Movement against Intimidation, Threat and Revenge against Activists. Abdulali is currently Governing Council member of the Bombay Natural History Society. Abdulali has been referred to as one of India's foremost environmental activists. Abdulali has spoken at events in universities such as Harvard University, IIT, Delhi University, Bombay University and has been awarded the Mother Teresa Award for Social Justice.

Kamila Faiz Badruddin Tyabji, KarmaVeer Puraskaar, was the founder and first chair of the Women's Indian Association of the United Kingdom and founder of Women's India Trust. Tyabji represented India at the United Nations Commission on the Status of Women. Tyabji attended St. Xavier's College, Bombay and St Hugh's College, Oxford, where Indira Gandhi was a classmate of hers. Tyabji is recognized as one of the first Muslim women to graduate from the University of Oxford and has published several works on Muhammadan Law.

Military 

Idris Hasan Latif, PVSM, was the 10th Air Chief Marshal. Latif served as the 11th Governor of Maharashtra from 1982 to 1985 and the as the Indian ambassador to France. Latif joined the Indian Air Force Volunteer Reserve (IAFVR) during World War II and worked with the Royal Air Force. Latif led the No. 4 Squadron IAF that led the fly-past during the first Republic Day parade in 1950. Latif served as the Air Attaché at the Embassy of India, Washington, D.C. from 1961 to 1965.

Krishna Swaminathan, AVSM, VSM, is a serving Flag officer in the Indian Navy and is the Chief of Staff of the Western Naval Command. Swaminathan was the second Commanding Officer of the aircraft carrier INS Vikramaditya. Swaminathan attended the Bishop Cotton Boys' School and the Sainik School, Bijapur before graduating from the National Defence Academy, Pune. Swaminathan is a specialist in Communication and Electronic Warfare and completed his courses at the Joint Services Command and Staff College, Shrivenham in the United Kingdom and the higher command course at the College of Naval Warfare in Mumbai. Swaminathan has also attended the Naval War College, Newport, Rhode Island in the United States.

Captain Nadir Salahuddin Tyabji was in the Royal Indian Navy and assisted in the evacuation of hundreds of thousands of Indian settlers from Burma. Tyabji played a role in reducing Japanese advancements in Burma during World War II.

Film and fine art 

Mário João Carlos do Rosário de Brito Miranda, Padma Vibhushan, Padma Bhushan, Padma Shri, Order of Prince Henry, Order of Isabel the Catholic, referred to as Mario Miranda is a cartoonist and painter based in the Indian state of Goa. Miranda has worked with The Times of India, The Economic Times, and The Illustrated Weekly of India. Miranda studied at St. Joseph's Boys' High School, Bangalore and received a B.A. in history from St. Xavier's College, Mumbai. His caricatures have been published in magazines like Mad, Lilliput and Punch. Miranda has held solo exhibitions in over 22 countries, including the United States, Japan, Brazil, Australia, Singapore, France, Yugoslavia, and Portugal.

Samuel Fyzee-Rahamin is an Indian painter of portraits, figures, landscapes, and murals. Rahamin studied at the School of Art, Bombay, and for four years at the Royal Academy Schools, London under John S. Sargent and Solomon J. Solomon. Rahamin is considered to be the first Muslim artist to enter the collection of the Tate Modern Art Gallery, and possibly the first non-European artist. Rahamin has exhibited with the Bombay Art Society and assisted the Victoria and Albert Museum and the Metropolitan Museum, New York, in the reorganisation of their oriental sections. The collection of Rahamin’s own paintings and other works of art which he presented to the Aiwan-e-Riffat Museum in Karachi is now housed in a separate building as the Fyzee Rehamin Art Gallery.

Aditi Rao Hydari is an Indian actress. Hydari gained attention for her performance in Sudhir Mishra's 2011 romantic thriller Yeh Saali Zindagi, which won her the Screen Award for Best Supporting Actress. Hydari graduated from Lady Shri Ram College, University of Delhi. In 2016, Hydari starred alongside Amitabh Bachchan and Farhan Akhtar in Bejoy Nambiar's crime thriller film Wazir.

Sports 

Ali Athar Hassanally Fyzee was part of India’s first ever Olympic contingent comprising Indian nationals in the 1924 Summer Olympic Games in Paris. Fyzee competed in singles tennis and reached the round of 64. Fyzee won bronze in the 1926 World Table Tennis Championships in London. Fyzee played for the Indian Davis Cup team and participated in 15 editions of the Wimbledon Championships between 1910 and 1933. Fyzee’s best result in the singles event was reaching the third round in 1926. Fyzee played at Roland Garros in 1925-27, 1929 and 1934, making the round of 16 in 1925 where he lost to René Lacoste.

Dr. Ali Azhar Hassanally Fyzee won bronze in the 1926 World Table Tennis Championships in London. Fyzee was the President of the Table Tennis Federation of India and played a role in the foundation of the International Table Tennis Federation. He reached the quarter finals of the British Covered Court Championships in tennis losing to Stanley Doust. Fyzee played for the Indian Davis Cup team winning 4 of his 17 single matches and 6 of his 11 doubles matches. Fyzee played at Wimbledon and Roland Garros he ended his career with a 67% win rate. Fyzee won the Herga LTC tournament at Harrow three times, the Northern Championships in Liverpool, the Roehampton tournament defeating Nicolae Mișu of Romania, the Midland Counties Championships at Edgbaston, the Welsh Covered Court Championships at Craigside, Llandudno indoors twice, and the North London Hardcourts at Highbury. Fyzee was medical officer and adviser for the first ever Indian Olympic contingent at the 1920 Summer Olympics in Antwerp.

Family tree

References 

Indian families
Political families of India
Muslim families
Indian royalty
History of India
Indian nobility
Tyabji family
Sulaymani Bohras